
This is a list of players who graduated from the Challenge Tour in 2009. The top 20 players on the Challenge Tour's money list in 2009 earned their European Tour card for 2010.

* European Tour rookie in 2010
T = Tied 
 The player retained his European Tour card for 2011 (finished inside the top 117).
 The player did not retain his European Tour Tour card for 2011, but retained conditional status (finished between 118-150).
 The player did not retain his European Tour card for 2011 (finished outside the top 150).

Molinari won three Challenge Tour events in 2009. The players ranked 16th through 20th were placed below the Qualifying School graduates on the exemption list, and thus could improve their status by competing in Qualifying School; Julien Guerrier improved his status in this way.

Winners on the European Tour in 2010

Runners-up on the European Tour in 2010

See also
2009 European Tour Qualifying School graduates

External links
Final ranking for 2010

Challenge Tour
European Tour
Challenge Tour Graduates
Challenge Tour Graduates